WCLV may refer to:

WCLV, a radio station licensed to Cleveland, Ohio, which has identified as WCLV since 2022
WCPN, a radio station licensed to Lorain, Ohio, which identified as WCLV-FM from 2001 to 2003 and as WCLV from 2003 to 2022
WFHM-FM, a radio station licensed to Cleveland, Ohio, which identified as WCLV from 1962 to 2001
WHK (AM), a radio station licensed to Cleveland, Ohio, which identified as WCLV from 2001 to 2003
WLGS-LP, a radio station licensed to Lake Villa, Illinois, which held the WCLV-LP call sign in 2004
"WCLV-TV," a fictional television station depicted in "Local 58,"  a YouTube series by Kris Straub